James E. Stewart (December 9, 1814 – July 18, 1890) was a nineteenth-century American politician from Virginia.

Early and family life
Stewart was born in Berkeley County, Virginia in 1814. He graduated from Washington and Jefferson College further along the National Road in Washington, Pennsylvania, then studied law in Baltimore, Maryland.

Career

After admission to the bar, Stewart practiced law in various counties in what later became known as the Eastern Panhandle of West Virginia. Berkeley County voters elected Stewart as one of their (part-time) representatives In the Virginia House of Delegates in 1847. He served alongside veteran Thomas Brown, but in 1848 voters instead elected veteran lawyer-delegate Charles J. Faulkner and William L. Boak (who were both in turn replaced in 1849).

In 1850, voters in Frederick, Hampshire and Morgan counties elected Stewart as one of their four delegates to the Virginia Constitutional Convention of 1850. He served alongside veteran Thomas Sloan, Richard E. Byrd and Charles Blue.

Following a two year stint as editor of the Martinsburg Virginia (WV) Gazette, Stewart held a job in the Federal Government in Washington, DC until the outbreak of the American Civil War.

During the American Civil War in 1863, Stewart relocated to Page County, Virginia. There he published the weekly Page Courier in 1870, He was elected a county judge in 1873, and he held the position for many years.

Death
James E. Stewart died in Virginia on July 18, 1890.

References

Bibliography

Members of the Virginia House of Delegates
1814 births
1890 deaths
Lawyers from Martinsburg, West Virginia
Washington & Jefferson College alumni
Virginia lawyers
People from Page County, Virginia
19th-century American politicians
People of Virginia in the American Civil War
19th-century American lawyers
Politicians from Martinsburg, West Virginia
Editors of Virginia newspapers